Losa del Obispo is a municipality in the comarca of Los Serranos in the Valencian Community, Spain. The name in Valencian is La Llosa del Bisbe, but the local language is Spanish, not Valencian.

References

Municipalities in the Province of Valencia
Los Serranos